Duvili Ella or Walawe Ganga East Falls (Sinhala: දූවිලි ඇල්ල) is a waterfall in Ratnapura District, Sri Lanka. The name 'Duwili' is derived from the Sinhalese for dust, which describes the spray emanating from the waterfall.

See also
 List of waterfalls of Sri Lanka

References

Tourist attractions in Sabaragamuwa Province
Landforms of Ratnapura District
Waterfalls of Sri Lanka